Sorbus × pinnatifida is a widely cultivated ornamental shrub that is thought to be a form of Sorbus × thuringiaca (Nyman) Schonach. It is cultivated by grafting.

Sorbus × thuringiaca is the diploid hybrid between S. aucuparia and diploid S. aria. It is rare in the wild, but occurs at scattered sites across much of Europe.

References

pinnatifida
Hybrid plants